The Catholic dioceses in Great Britain are organised by two separate hierarchies: the Catholic Church in England and Wales, and the Catholic Church in Scotland.  Within Great Britain, the Catholic Church of England and Wales has five provinces, subdivided into 22 dioceses, and the Catholic Church of Scotland has two provinces, subdivided into 8 dioceses. The Catholic dioceses in Northern Ireland are organised together with those in the Republic of Ireland, as the Church in Ireland was not divided when civil authority in Ireland was partitioned in the 1920s.

A diocese, also known as a bishopric, is an administrative unit under the supervision of a bishop. The Diocese of Westminster is considered the mother church of English and Welsh Catholics, and although not formally a primate, the archbishop of Westminster is usually elected President of the Catholic Bishops' Conference of England and Wales providing a degree of a formal direction for the other English bishops and archbishops.

From the time of the English Reformation in the 16th century, with Catholicism being declared illegal, there were no Catholic dioceses in England and Wales. In time, there came to be appointed several apostolic vicars, bishops of titular sees governing not in their own name, as diocesan bishops do, but provisionally in the name of the Pope. However, with the passing of the Catholic Relief Act 1829, legalising the practice of the Catholic faith again, Pope Pius IX re-established the Catholic Church diocesan hierarchy on 29 September 1850 by issuing the bull Universalis Ecclesiae. The Hierarchy in Scotland was restored in 1878.

Three Catholic dioceses, those of Leeds, Liverpool, and Portsmouth, share their territorial name with Anglican dioceses, the Anglican Diocese of Leeds, the Anglican diocese of Liverpool, and the Anglican Diocese of Portsmouth respectively. However, in these cases the dioceses cover differing areas.

The Catholic Church in Scotland comprises two Latin ecclesiastical provinces each headed by a Metropolitan archbishop. The provinces in turn are subdivided into 6 dioceses and 2 archdioceses, each headed by a bishop or an archbishop, respectively.

There is an Apostolic Nunciature to Great Britain as papal diplomatic representation (embassy-level) to the British authorities (UK)

Current Latin provinces and sees in Great Britain

Episcopal Conference of England and Wales

Ecclesiastical province of Birmingham (founded 1911)

Ecclesiastical province of Cardiff (founded 1916)

Ecclesiastical province of Liverpool (founded 1911)

Ecclesiastical province of Southwark (founded 1965)

Ecclesiastical province of Westminster (founded 1850)

Episcopal conference of Scotland

Ecclesiastical province of Saint Andrews and Edinburgh 
 Metropolitan Archdiocese of Saint Andrews and Edinburgh (cathedral St Mary's Metropolitan Cathedral, Edinburgh; established 1878)
Diocese of Aberdeen (cathedral St Mary's Cathedral, Aberdeen; established 1878)
Diocese of Argyll and the Isles (cathedral St Columba's Cathedral, Oban; established 1878; originally in the Province of Glasgow)
Diocese of Dunkeld (cathedral St Andrew's Cathedral, Dundee; established 1878)
Diocese of Galloway (cathedral St Margaret's Cathedral, Ayr; established 1878; originally in the Province of Glasgow)

Ecclesiastical province of Glasgow 
 Metropolitan Archdiocese of Glasgow (cathedral St Andrew's Cathedral, Glasgow; established 1878)
Diocese of Motherwell (cathedral Cathedral of Our Lady of Good Aid, Motherwell; established 1947)
Diocese of Paisley (cathedral St Mirin's Cathedral, Paisley; established 1947)

Eastern Catholic and other exempt 
 The Bishopric of the Forces in Great Britain (1917) is the Military Ordinariate for all British armed forces, even outside the UK

The Syro-Malabar Catholic Eparchy of Great Britain (2016)

 The Ukrainian Catholic Eparchy of Holy Family of London (1957)

The Eastern Catholic Churches are autonomous, self-governing particular churches in full communion with the Pope.

 The Personal Ordinariate of Our Lady of Walsingham (2011) is one of three Personal Ordinariates. The ordinariates were established in order to enable "groups of Anglicans" to join the Catholic Church while preserving elements of their liturgical and spiritual patrimony. Personal Ordinariates are headed by Ordinaries.

Defunct jurisdictions 
 Archpriest of England from 1598 to 1621.
 Apostolic Vicariate of England from 1623 to 1688 when it was divided into four districts that lasted until a general redivision in 1840:

Apostolic Vicariate of the London District until 1850
 Apostolic Vicariate of the Western District until 1850
 Apostolic Vicariate of the Midland District until 1840
 Apostolic Vicariate of the Northern District until 1850
Apostolic Vicariate of the Welsh District created from Western District in 1840 until 1850
 Apostolic Vicariate of the Central District created from Midland District in 1840 until 1850 
 Apostolic Vicariate of the Eastern District created from Midland District in 1840 until 1850
 Apostolic Vicariate of the Lancashire District created from the Northern District in 1840 until 1850
 Apostolic Vicariate of the Yorkshire District created from the Northern District in 1840 until 1850
 Diocese of Beverley, from 1850 to 1878, replaced by the Diocese of Leeds and the Diocese of Middlesbrough.
 Diocese of Newport and Menevia, from 1850 to 1895, replaced by the Diocese of Newport, which became the Archdiocese of Cardiff in 1916, and the Apostolic Vicariate of Wales, which became the Diocese of Menevia in 1898.
 Prefecture Apostolic of Scotland from 1653 to 1694.
 Apostolic Vicariate of Scotland from 1694 to 1727 when it split into two districts that lasted until 1827:
 Apostolic Vicariate of the Lowland District
 Apostolic Vicariate of the Highland District
 Apostolic Vicariate of the Eastern District from 1827 to 1878 when it became the Archdiocese of St Andrews and Edinburgh.
 Apostolic Vicariate of the Western District from 1827 to 1878 when it became the Archdiocese of Glasgow
 Apostolic Vicariate of the Northern District from 1827 to 1878 when it became the Diocese of Aberdeen.

See also 
 List of Catholic dioceses (structured view) (including archdioceses)
 List of Catholic dioceses (alphabetical) (including archdioceses)
 List of Catholic archdioceses (by country and continent)
 Apostolic Nunciature to Great Britain
 Catholic Church in England and Wales
 List of Catholic churches in the United Kingdom
 Scotland
Catholic Church in Scotland
Bishops' Conference of Scotland
:Category:Roman Catholic cathedrals in Scotland

References

Sources and external links 
 GCatholic.org - England and Wales
 Catholic-Hierarchy entry
 Scotland
 GCatholic.org - Scotland
 Catholic-Hierarchy Scotland
 Edinburgh Statistics
 Glasgow Statistics

 
England and Wales
Roman Catholic ecclesiastical provinces in the United Kingdom
Catholic dioceses